Mazet is a French surname. Notable people with the surname include:

François Mazet (born 1943), French racing cyclist
Jonna Mazet (born 1967), American epidemiologist
Julien Mazet (born 1981), French cyclist

See also
Mazet-Saint-Voy, commune in Haute-Loire, France

French-language surnames